AS Police is a Malian football club based in Bamako. They play in the Malien Première Division, the top division in Malian football.

League participations
Malien Première Division: 2009–
Malien Second Division:

Stadium
Currently, the team plays at the 55,000 capacity Stade du 26 Mars.

References

External links
Soccerway
Futbol24

Football clubs in Mali
Sport in Bamako
Police association football clubs